Notomulciber ochreosignatus is a species of beetle in the family Cerambycidae. It was described by Heller in 1921. It is known from Philippines.

References

Homonoeini
Beetles described in 1921